Expeditie Robinson 2018 is the nineteenth season of the Dutch version of the Swedish television series Expedition Robinson. This season, seven non-celebrities compete against two teams of seven celebrities to win €25,000 and win the title of Robinson 2018. The season premiered on 6 September 2018.

Finishing order

Future Appearances
Loiza Lamers returned to compete in Expeditie Robinson 2021. Dominique Hazeleger, Gregory Sedoc, and Jan Bronninkreef returned to compete in Expeditie Robinson: All Stars.

References

External links

Expeditie Robinson seasons
2018 Dutch television seasons